The Hamburger Kunsthalle is the art museum of the Free and Hanseatic City of Hamburg, Germany. It is one of the largest art museums in the country. The museum consists of three connected buildings, dating from 1869 (main building), 1921 (Kuppelsaal) and 1997 (Galerie der Gegenwart), located in the Altstadt district between the Hauptbahnhof (central train station) and the two Alster lakes.

The name Kunsthalle indicates the museum's history as an 'art hall' when it was founded in 1850. Today, the museum houses one of the few art collections in Germany that cover seven centuries of European art, from the Middle Ages to the present day. The Kunsthalle's permanent collections focus on North German painting of the 14th century, paintings by Dutch, Flemish and Italian artists of the 16th and 17th centuries, French and German drawings and paintings of the 19th century, and international modern and contemporary art.

History 

The museum collection traces its origin to 1849, when it was initially established by the Hamburg Kunstverein, which was founded in 1817. The collection opened to the public a year later as the Städtische Gallerie (municipal painting gallery).

The collection grew quickly, and it soon became necessary to provide a suitable building. The original red-brick Kunsthalle building was constructed from 1863 to 1869. It was designed by architects Georg Theodor Schirrmacher and Hermann von der Hude, and financed largely through private donations.

The Kunsthalle's first director was the art historian and educator Alfred Lichtwark (1852–1914). His successor during the interwar period was Gustav Pauli. He oversaw the completion of the Kuppelsaal (domed-hall) extension, the museum's first annex, designed by Fritz Schumacher and erected between 1914 and 1921.

In 1994, a painting of the Kunsthalle was involved in the so-called Frankfurt art theft. While on loan to the Kunsthalle Schirn in Frankfurt, the painting Nebelschwaden by Caspar David Friedrich was stolen. After negotiations with the thieves, a lawyer bought back the painting; when the Kunsthalle refused to pay him the agreed "consideration", he sued and won.

In 1997, the museum opened the Galerie der Gegenwart building, an extension of  that was designed by Cologne architect Oswald Mathias Ungers and that is dedicated to the Kunsthalle's contemporary art collections. The cubic building sits on a monolithic base at a prominent location in close proximity to the Binnenalster.

Collections 
The Kunsthalle is divided into four different sections: the Gallery of Old Masters, the Gallery of 19th-century Art, the Gallery of Classical Modernism, and the Gallery of Contemporary Art.

The highlights of the collection include the medieval alters of Master Bertram and Master Francke, 17th-century Dutch paintings, works of early to mid 19th-century German Romanticism, and collections of impressionism and classic modernism. The Kunsthalle is also known for its international contemporary art collections and exhibitions, which include post-1950 Pop Art, conceptual art, video art and photography.

Old Masters 
The Old Masters Collection shows works by Bartel Beham, Bernardo Bellotto, Lucas Cranach the Younger, Master Francke, Francisco José de Goya y Lucientes, Johann Georg Hinz, Jan Massys, Giambattista Pittoni, Rembrandt Harmensz van Rijn, Peter Paul Rubens, Jacob Isaacksz van Ruisdael and Giovanni Battista Tiepolo, among others.

19th-century art 
The Gallery of 19th-century Art shows work by Carl Blechen, Arnold Böcklin, Gustave Courbet, Edgar Degas, Anselm Feuerbach, Caspar David Friedrich, Jean-Léon Gérôme, Wilhelm Leibl, Max Liebermann, Édouard Manet, Adolph Menzel, Claude Monet, Auguste Rodin and Philipp Otto Runge, among others.

Modern art 
The Classical Modernism gallery shows works by Francis Bacon, Max Beckmann, Lovis Corinth, James Ensor, Max Ernst, Ernst Ludwig Kirchner, Paul Klee, Oskar Kokoschka, Paula Modersohn-Becker, Edvard Munch, Emil Nolde and Pablo Picasso, among others.

Contemporary art 
The Gallery of Contemporary Art shows works by Joseph Beuys, Tracey Emin, David Hockney, Rebecca Horn, Ilya Kabakov, On Kawara, Yves Klein, Kitty Kraus, Robert Morris, Hermann Nitsch, George Segal, Richard Serra, Franz Erhard Walther and Andy Warhol, among others.

Temporary exhibitions  
The Hamburg Kunsthalle continuisly carries out temporary exhibitions on contemporary and historic art, in addition to its constant rotation of temporary exhibitions. Yearly there are on average 20 special exhibitions.

Past temporary exhibitions 
 2002: Miron Schmückle. Fountains of Joy. Improved Formula
 2010–2011: Cosmos Runge. The Dawn of Romanticism
 2011–2012: Max Liebermann. Pioneer of Modern Art
 2012–2013: Giacometti. The Playing Fields
 2013–2014: Serial Attitudes, Repetition as an artistic method since the 1960s
 2013–2014: Alfred Flechtheim.com, Art Dealer of the Avant-Garde
 2014–2015: ars viva Prize for Fine Arts
 2014–2015: Max Beckmann. The Still Lifes
 2014–2015: Feuerbach’s Muses — Lagerfeld’s Models
 2014–2016: SPOT ON, Masterpieces from the Hamburger Kunsthalle
 2015–2016: Nolde in Hamburg

Gallery

See also  

 List of museums and cultural institutions in Hamburg
 List of art museums

References

External links 

  
 Freunde der Kunsthalle (friends' association) 
 Online shop 
 The Cube Restaurant in the Gallery of Contemporary Art of the Hamburger Kunsthalle 
 Hamburger Kunsthalle on Hamburg Tourism 

Art museums and galleries in Germany
Museums in Hamburg
Buildings and structures in Hamburg-Mitte
Art museums established in 1869
1869 establishments in Germany
Tourist attractions in Hamburg